Cyperus flavoculmis is a species of sedge that is endemic to an area of Kenya.

The species was first formally described by the botanist Kåre Arnstein Lye in 1983.

See also
 List of Cyperus species

References

flavoculmis
Flora of Kenya
Plants described in 1983
Taxa named by Kåre Arnstein Lye